Ad Zonderland (2 October 1940 – 15 August 2007) was a Dutch football manager and football administrator. He worked for several Dutch football clubs, most notably Feyenoord (as assistant and interim manager) and Ajax (as coordinator of their Ghana and South Africa academies).

Managerial career 
Zonderland started his managerial career with JOS and then moved to De Graafschap, where he became first team manager in 1967. Here, he would become known for "discovering" Guus Hiddink as a player, convincing him to switch from youth coach to professional footballer. He also led the club to promotion to the Eerste Divisie by winning the Tweede Divisie in the 1968–69 season. In 1971, he was contracted by Feyenoord as assistant manager. On two occasions, he acted as interim manager: in 1973, after Ernst Happel left the club, and in 1976, when Antoni Brzeżańczyk departed.

Zonderland then became manager of Eerste Divisie club FC Den Bosch, a post he fulfilled for two seasons between 1976 and 1978. He subsequently became general director, a position he would hold for nine years aside from a temporary return as manager from 1980 to 1981.

Later career 
In 1990, Zonderland was hired as director of Heracles Almelo. Between 1992 and 1995, he served FC Utrecht in the same capacity. Subsequently, Zonderland was appointed by Ajax to coordinate their new football academy in Ghana. As such, he appeared in the 2000 documentary Ajax: Hark the Herald Angel Sings. After four years in Ghana, in 2002, Zonderland was appointed "director of the coaches" at Ajax Cape Town in South Africa.

Zonderland died in Borne on 15 August 2007, aged 66, of a terminal illness.

Managerial honours 
De Graafschap
 Tweede Divisie winners: 1968–69

References 

1940 births
2007 deaths
Footballers from Haarlem
Dutch football managers
De Graafschap managers
Feyenoord managers
FC Den Bosch managers
Eredivisie managers
Eerste Divisie managers
Dutch expatriates in Ghana
Dutch expatriates in South Africa
JOS Watergraafsmeer managers
Association footballers not categorized by position
Association football players not categorized by nationality